Taibang Keithel (English: Living Market)  is a 2018 comedy Indian Meitei language film written and directed by Satyajit BK and produced by Miltan Langonjam, under the banner of Soraren Films. It stars Khwairakpam Bishwamittra in the lead role. The movie was premiered at Manipur State Film Development Society (MSFDS), Palace Compound, on 9 September 2018.

The film was released by Amitra Video in DVD on 4 March 2020. Taibang Keithel has no female characters. The director clarified that the casting of only male characters was not intentional.

Synopsis
The movie centres around a village man Ahanjao who comes to Imphal, the capital city of Manipur in search for a job. He got caught in a series of incidents which never ought to happen. The movie revolves around how he tries to find himself out of these entangled incidents. It also shows how the capital city changes in due course of time.

Cast
 Khwairakpam Bishwamittra as Ahanjao
 Bobo Ningthoukhongjam as Koireng
 Gurumayum Priyogopal as Lukhoi
 Idhou as Achou
 Prem Sharma as Ningthembi
 Ibomcha as Tomei
 Ratan Lai
 Mahanta
 Nunglen Luwang
 Chandrasing
 Bonendro
 Deepak Mutum
 Rajpritam
 Barun

Accolades
Khwairakpam Bishwamittra won the Best Actor in a Leading Role at the 12th Manipur State Film Awards 2019.

Music
Tenao HD composed the soundtrack for the film and Satyajit BK wrote the lyrics. The song is titled Taibang Keithel Karakpani.

References

2010s Meitei-language films
2018 films